The Priestley Medal is the highest honor conferred by the American Chemical Society (ACS) and is awarded for distinguished service in the field of chemistry. Established in 1922, the award is named after Joseph Priestley, the discoverer of oxygen who immigrated to the United States of America in 1794.  The ACS formed in 1876, spearheaded by a group of chemists who had met two years previously in Priestley's home.

The Priestley Medal is among the most distinguished awards in the chemical sciences, behind the Wolf Prize in Chemistry and the Nobel Prize in Chemistry. Consequently, it is commonly awarded to scientists who are advanced in their fields, as it is intended to commemorate lifetime achievement.  When the ACS started presenting the Priestley Medal in 1923, they intended to award it every three years.  This continued until 1944, when it became an annual award.

Recipients

1920s
 1923 Ira Remsen
 1926 Edgar Fahs Smith
 1929 Francis P. Garvan

1930s
 1932 Charles L. Parsons
 1935 William A. Noyes
 1938 Marston T. Bogert

1940s
 1941 Thomas Midgley, Jr.
 1944 James Bryant Conant
 1945 Ian Heilbron
 1946 Roger Adams
 1947 Warren K. Lewis
 1948 Edward R. Weidlein
 1949 Arthur B. Lamb

1950s
 1950 Charles A. Kraus
 1951 E. J. Crane
 1952 Samuel C. Lind
 1953 Sir Robert Robinson
 1954 W. Albert Noyes, Jr. (son of William A. Noyes)
 1955 Charles A. Thomas
 1956 Carl S. Marvel
 1957 Farrington Daniels
 1958 Ernest H. Volwiler
 1959 Hermann Irving Schlesinger

1960s
 1960 Wallace R. Brode
 1961 Louis Plack Hammett
 1962 Joel H. Hildebrand
 1963 Peter J. W. Debye
 1964 John C. Bailar, Jr.
 1965 William J. Sparks
 1966 William O. Baker
 1967 Ralph Connor
 1968 William G. Young
 1969 Kenneth S. Pitzer

1970s
 1970 Max Tishler
 1971 Frederick D. Rossini
 1972 George B. Kistiakowsky
 1973 Harold C. Urey
 1974 Paul J. Flory
 1975 Henry Eyring
 1976 George S. Hammond
 1977 Henry Gilman
 1978 Melvin Calvin
 1979 Glenn T. Seaborg

1980s
 1980 Milton Harris
 1981 Herbert C. Brown
 1982 Bryce Crawford, Jr.
 1983 Robert S. Mulliken
 1984 Linus Pauling
 1985 Henry Taube
 1986 Karl A. Folkers
 1987 John D. Roberts
 1988 Frank H. Westheimer
 1989 George C. Pimentel

1990s
 1990 Roald Hoffmann
 1991 Harry B. Gray
 1992 Carl Djerassi
 1993 Robert W. Parry
 1994 Howard E. Simmons
 1995 Sir Derek H. R. Barton
 1996 Ernest L. Eliel
 1997 Mary L. Good
 1998 F. Albert Cotton
 1999 Ronald Breslow

2000s
 2000 Darleane C. Hoffman
 2001 Fred Basolo
 2002 Allen J. Bard
 2003 Edwin J. Vandenberg
 2004 Elias J. Corey
 2005 George A. Olah
 2006 Paul S. Anderson
 2007 George M. Whitesides
 2008 Gabor A. Somorjai
 2009 M. Frederick Hawthorne

2010s
 2010 Richard Zare
 2011 Ahmed H. Zewail
 2012 Robert S. Langer
 2013 Peter J. Stang
 2014 Stephen J. Lippard
2015 Jacqueline Barton
2016 Mostafa El-Sayed
2017 Tobin J. Marks
2018 Geraldine L. Richmond
 2019 Karl Barry Sharpless

2020s
 2020 JoAnne Stubbe
 2021 A. Paul Alivisatos
 2022 Peter B. Dervan

See also

 List of chemistry awards

References

Further reading

External links
 The Priestley Society

Awards of the American Chemical Society
Awards established in 1922